Eliud Ulises Ayala Zamora is a Salvadoran politician. He served as El Salvador's Minister of Public Works. He served as Viceminister of Public Works from 1 January 2017 to 30 November 2017 and then as Minister of Public Works from 1 December 2017 until the end of the Executive branch term on 31 May 2019.

References

Living people
Government ministers of El Salvador
Year of birth missing (living people)